Hockeytown and Hockey Town are generic words used in common practice throughout the United States and Canada to identify any town, city or community that has a history and reputation of participating in the sport of ice hockey. Many North American cities are and have been referred to by the label. Warroad, Minnesota was the first city known to use the designation "Hockeytown".  The term has been used to describe the following cities:

 Berlin, New Hampshire – Earned the title in 2002, after almost 90 years of a rich hockey history. Claims to be the breeding ground for some of the best players. 
 Binghamton, New York has been referred to as Hockey Town since the mid-1970s. After a tepid first year of support, the Broome Dusters grew greatly in popularity, and were able to draw many sellouts. The quick success led the Hockey News to declare Binghamton as Hockey Town USA.  Binghamton is home to a Federal Prospects Hockey League franchise.
 Denver, Colorado – Earned the title in 2022, after the Colorado Avalanche won the Stanley Cup, the University of Denver Pioneers won the NCAA National Championship, and the Denver East Angels won the USA Hockey High School National Championship. In addition the Colorado Warriors (Disabled Veteran hockey) of the Warrior hockey discipline within USA Hockey won 2 championships in 3 divisions (including the top tier) of the 2022 USA Hockey Warrior Classic (National Championship) in Detroit, MI, October 30, 2022. The Avalanche and the Pioneers became the first professional and college teams from the same city to win the Stanley Cup and the NCAA Division I National Championship in the same year since the Boston Bruins and the Boston University Terriers in 1972.
 Detroit, Michigan – The phrase "Hockeytown", when combined with the distinctive winged wheel logo of the NHL's Detroit Red Wings, is a registered trademark owned by the franchise.
Traverse City, Michigan has been referred to as "Hockeytown North", due to the Red Wings' training camp being located at Traverse City's Centre Ice Arena.
 Montreal, Quebec has been described as the "Best Hockey City in North America". The first indoor ice hockey game was played in the city, on 3 March 1875. The formalized modern sport of ice hockey originated in Montreal in 1877.
 Nashville, Tennessee was referred to as a kind of Hockeytown in May, 2017.
 O'Leary, Prince Edward Island has been described as "Hockeytown PEI".
 Warroad, Minnesota has been referred to as "Hockeytown" for over 50 years. The Hockeytown Holiday Classic has been played in Warroad since 1994. 

The phrase "hockey town" has also been applied to Boston, Massachusetts; Buffalo, New York; Nashville, Tennessee; Philadelphia, Pennsylvania; Saint Paul, Minnesota; Pardubice, Czech Republic; Sarpsborg, Norway; and Skellefteå, Sweden.

References

Ice hockey terminology